The 27th Annual TV Week Logie Awards was held on Friday 26 April 1985 at the World Trade Centre in Melbourne, and broadcast on Network Ten. The ceremony was hosted by Greg Evans. Guests included Anne Baxter, Larry Hagman, Linda Gray, Pamela Bellwood, Jane Badler, Melody Thomas, James Brolin, Andrew Stevens and Mel Blanc.

Winners

Gold Logie
Most Popular Personality on Australian Television
Winner:
Rowena Wallace in Sons and Daughters (Seven Network)

Acting/Presenting

Most Popular Lead Actor
Winner: Grant Dodwell in A Country Practice (Seven Network)

Most Popular Lead Actress
Winner: Anne Tenney in A Country Practice (Seven Network)

Best Lead Actor
Winner: Jack Thompson in Waterfront (Network Ten)

Best Lead Actress
Winner: Greta Scacchi in Waterfront (Network Ten)

Best Supporting Actor in a Miniseries or Telemovie
Winner: Max Cullen in The Last Bastion (Network Ten)

Best Supporting Actress in a Miniseries or Telemovie
Winner: Noni Hazlehurst in Waterfront (Network Ten)

Best Lead Actor in a Series
Winner: Shane Withington in A Country Practice (Seven Network)

Best Lead Actress in a Series
Winner: Rowena Wallace in Sons and Daughters (Seven Network)

Best Supporting Actor in a Series
Winner: Ian Rawlings in Sons and Daughters (Seven Network)

Best Supporting Actress in a Series
Winner: Wendy Strehlow in A Country Practice (Seven Network)

Best Performance by a Juvenile
Winner: Ken Talbot in Danny's Egg (Nine Network)

Best New Talent in Australia
Winner: David Reyne in Sweet and Sour (ABC)

TV Reporter of the Year
Winner: Mike Munro for "Willesee" (Seven Network)

Special Award for Outstanding Contribution to the Australian Music Industry and Encouragement of Talent
Receiver: Ian "Molly" Meldrum

Most Popular Programs

Most Popular Drama Program
Winner: A Country Practice (Seven Network)

Most Popular Variety Program
Winner: The Mike Walsh Show (Nine Network)

Most Popular Comedy Program
Winner: Hey Hey It's Saturday (Nine Network)

Most Popular Game or Quiz Show
Winner: Perfect Match (Network Ten)

Most Popular Public Affairs Program
Winner: 60 Minutes (Nine Network)

Most Popular Documentary Series
Winner: Willesee Documentaries (Network Ten)

Most Popular Children's Program
Winner: Simon Townsend's Wonder World (Network Ten)

Best/Outstanding Programs

Best Single Miniseries or Telemovie
Winner: Waterfront (Network Ten)

Best Documentary
Winner: Frontline Afghanistan (ABC)

Best Special Events Telecast
Winner: 1984 Summer Olympics (Network Ten)

Best News Report
Winner: "Bank Siege" (Seven Network)

Outstanding Public Affairs Report
Winner: "The Education of Stephen Lusher", 60 Minutes (Nine Network)

Outstanding Coverage of Sport 
Winner: James Hardie 1000 (Seven Network)

Most Outstanding Contribution by a Regional Station
Winner: Autumn Faces (GMV6, Shepparton)

Special Award for Sustained Excellence
Receiver: 60 Minutes (Nine Network)

Performers
Ricky May
Marcia Hines
Debra Byrne

Hall of Fame
After a lifetime in the Australian television industry, Ken G. Hall became the second inductee into the TV Week Logies Hall of Fame.

References

External links
 

1985 in Australian television
1985 television awards
1985